The Iran–Armenia gas pipeline is a  long pipeline from Iran to Armenia. The Armenian section runs from the Meghri region to Kajaran, and another  of pipeline is planned to reach the center of the country, where it will link up with the existing distribution network.

History
The plans to build the pipeline was initially announced on 15 April 2002 by Armenian Energy Minister Armen Movsisian. It started operations on 20 December 2006, and was officially inaugurated by the Presidents Mahmoud Ahmadinejad of Iran and Robert Kocharyan of Armenia on 19 March 2007. There are discussions to build a second pipeline from Iran to Armenia.

Technical features
The initial capacity of pipeline is 1.1 billion cubic meters (bcm) of natural gas per year, which will be increased up to 2.3 bcm by 2019. The contract was signed for 20 years. For each cubic meter of the Iranian gas, Armenia is supposed to return 3 kwh of electric energy to Iran.

Political controversy
Many suspect that the pipeline's diameter was reduced from  under pressure from Gazprom, which purchased a majority share in the Armenian section of the pipeline through its subsidiary, Armrosgazprom. If the pipeline had been built at the initial diameter, it would have allowed Iran to export to markets in Europe, therefore competing with Russia's own natural gas industry. Analysts argue that the pipeline was in part intended to extend Iran's influence in Caucasus, however was subdued to Russian control before the construction ended.

On 11 November 2009, Armenian officials reported an explosion of some segment of the pipeline within the Armenian borders. Once the damage is repaired, Iran will resume flow of gas to Armenia.

See also 

Iran–Armenia relations

References

External links
 Iran–Armenia Natural Gas Pipeline, by Fikret Ertan, The Journal of Turkish Weekly. 30 January 2006
 Iran–Armenia gas pipeline project underway, by Alexander Gas & Oil Connections. 11 September 2006
 Second Iran–Armenia gas pipeline on the horizon, by Alexander Gas & Oil Connections. 14 September 2006
 Iran Oil Gas Directory, oilgas.ir

Armenia–Iran relations
Energy infrastructure completed in 2006
Natural gas pipelines in Armenia
Natural gas pipelines in Iran